Nicastrin, also known as NCSTN, is a protein that in humans is encoded by the NCSTN gene.

Function
Nicastrin (abbreviated NCT) is a protein that is part of the gamma secretase protein complex, which is one of the proteases involved in processing amyloid precursor protein (APP) to the short Alzheimer's disease-associated peptide amyloid beta. The other proteins in the complex are PSEN1 (presenilin-1), which is the catalytically active component of the complex, APH-1 (anterior pharynx-defective 1), and PEN-2 (presenilin enhancer 2). Nicastrin itself is not catalytically active, but instead promotes the maturation and proper trafficking of the other proteins in the complex, all of which undergo significant post-translational modification before becoming active in the cell. Nicastrin has also been identified as a regulator of neprilysin, an enzyme involved in the degradation of amyloid beta fragment.

History
The protein was named after the Italian country Nicastro, reflecting the fact that Alzheimer's disease was described in 1963 after studying descendants of an extended family originating in the country of Nicastro that had familial Alzheimer's disease (FAD).

Interactions 

Nicastrin has been shown to interact with PSEN1 and PSEN2.

References

External links 
 

Alzheimer's disease
Proteins